al-Turk or el-Turk and their variant casings, are portions of Arabic names, often adopted as a last name (or treated as such) in Western contexts.

Those with it in their names include:
 Ishaq al-Turk (fl. 8th century), Persian religious leader
 Ismail Fatah Al Turk (1934-2004), Iraqi artist
 Riyad al-Turk (born 1930), Syrian activist
 Mostapha al-Turk (born 1973), British fighter
 Omar El Turk (born 1981), Lebanese basketball player
 Hala Al Turk (born 2002), Bahraini child singer.

Arabic-language surnames